The Messenger Stakes is an American harness racing event for 3-year-old pacing horses. It was organized in 1956 at Roosevelt Raceway in Westbury, New York (on suburban Long Island) to join with the Cane Pace and the Little Brown Jug to create the Triple Crown of Harness Racing for Pacers. The race is named in honor of Messenger (1780–1808), a horse foaled in England and later brought to the United States. As a sire, virtually all harness horses in the U.S. can be traced back to Messenger.

One of the preeminent events for harness racing horses in North America, the race was held annually at Roosevelt Raceway until it closed down in 1988. From 1988 to 1994, the race changed locations several times, from Yonkers Raceway (Yonkers, New York) to Freestate Raceway to Rosecroft Raceway (both in Maryland).  In 1995, it moved to The Meadows Racetrack in the Pittsburgh, Pennsylvania area.  In 2004, the race was supposed to be moved back to Yonkers Raceway.  However, due to construction at the track, the race was moved to Harrington Raceway in Delaware, where the event was held in 2004 and '05. The race moved back to Yonkers Raceway in November 2006.  The 2015 edition was raced at Yonkers on September 5 for a total purse of US$500,000.

Much like the Little Brown Jug, the Messenger was raced in heat events, meaning a horse had to win an elimination heat and the final on the same day to be declared the winner. Starting from 2006 at Yonkers, there will be eliminations, if necessary, one week prior to the event.

Locations
1956–1987 - Roosevelt Raceway
1988, 2006–present - Yonkers Raceway
1989 - Freestate Raceway
1990–1994 - Rosecroft Raceway
1995–2003 - The Meadows Racetrack and Casino
2004–2005 - Harrington Raceway & Casino

Records
 Most wins by a driver
 8 – John Campbell (1986, 1987, 1990, 1994, 1995, 1998, 2000, 2004)

 Most wins by a trainer
 8 – Billy Haughton (1956, 1967, 1968, 1972, 1974, 1975, 1976, 1985)

 Stakes record
 1:50 3/5 – Allamerican Ingot (2002)

Messenger Stakes winners

References

Yonkers Raceway
Harness races in the United States
Harness races for three-year-old pacers
Messenger Stakes winners
Horse races in New York (state)
United States Triple Crown of Harness Racing
Sports in Yonkers, New York
Recurring sporting events established in 1956
1956 establishments in New York (state)